The Greek destroyer Spetsai (D-83) was a Greek destroyer of the , which served with the Hellenic Navy during the Second World War. It was named after the Saronic Gulf island of Spetses, which played an important role in the Greek War of Independence, and was the fourth ship to bear this name.

She was constructed in Sestri Ponente, Italy, by Cantieri Odero, and commissioned by the Hellenic Navy in 1933. After the outbreak of the Greco-Italian War, she participated in the naval operations, among which was the third naval raid against Italian shipping in the Strait of Otranto (4–5 January 1941). During the German invasion of Greece, along with several other ships, she managed to flee to Alexandria. After undergoing repairs and modernization in Calcutta, she returned to escort duties in the Mediterranean Sea, with the British pennant number H 38. She returned to Greece after liberation in October 1944 and was decommissioned in 1946.

References

Kountouriotis-class destroyers
Ships built in Italy
1932 ships
World War II destroyers of Greece